The Caux Round Table is an international organization of senior business executives aiming to promote ethical business practice. It was founded in 1986 by Frits Philips, president of Philips, and Olivier Giscard d'Estaing, along with Ryuzaburo Kaku, president of Canon.

Frits Philips had been alarmed to hear from reliable sources that the Japanese were dumping their products on the Western market and he feared a growing trade war. He saw the need for trustbuilding between international executives and for Corporate Social Responsibility practices. The CRT’s Principles for Business were published in 1994, incorporating western concepts (human dignity...) and Japanese ones (kyosei, interpreted as “living and working together for the common good”). An international code of good practices written by such senior industrialists from such varied backgrounds remains exceptional today. It was presented to the UN Social Summit in Copenhagen in 1994. It has since become a standard work, translated into 12 languages, and has been used as basis for their internal ethical assessments by international companies such as Nissan.

The CRT's principal activities are an annual meeting and the publication of best-practice guides for various types of organization. Every three years, the annual meeting is held at Caux, Switzerland, where the original initiative took place in 1986. Its chief executive is Stephen B. Young; it has set up chapters in many regions of the world.

Stephen. B. Young is the Global Executive Director of the Caux Round Table, an international network of experienced business leaders who advocate a principled approach to global capitalism. Young has published Moral Capitalism, a well-received book written as a guide to use of the Caux Round Table ethical and socially responsible Principles for Business. In 2008 Prof. Sandra Waddock of the Carroll School of Management of Boston College listed Young among the 23 persons who created the corporate social responsibility movement in her book The Difference Makers.

For the Caux Round Table, Young has partnered with scholars at the International Islamic University of Malaysia to formulate interpretations of Qur'anic guidance for good governance that emphasize the convergence between Qur'an teachings and the global standards advocated by the Caux Round Table.

References

International business organizations